The NWA World Six-Man Tag Team Championship was a professional wrestling championship sanctioned by the National Wrestling Alliance (NWA) and originally promoted in the NWA Mid-America territory based out of Tennessee. Originally called the "NWA Six-Man Tag Team Championship" NWA Mid-America promoted the title from 1974 until 1981. In 1984 another NWA territory, Jim Crockett Promotions, brought the concept back, this time as the "NWA World Six-Man Tag Team Championship" which it promoted until 1989. The Championship was briefly revived in 1998 by NWA New Jersey/Championship Wrestling America. As the name indicates the championship was exclusively for three man teams that competed in six-man tag team matches. Because the championship was a professional wrestling championship, it was won or lost by the decision of the bookers of a wrestling promotion.

Title history

See also
WCWA World Six-Man Tag Team Championship, split-off title from World Class Championship Wrestling billed as an NWA title before World Class split from the NWA. 
WCW World Six-Man Tag Team Championship, revival of the championship in WCW (never billed as an NWA title though WCW was an NWA member throughout).
WAR World Six-Man Tag Team Championship, revival of the championship by Genichiro Tenryu in his WAR promotion in Japan.

Footnotes

References
General sources

Specific sources

Jim Crockett Promotions championships
National Wrestling Alliance championships
NWA Mid-America championships
Trios wrestling tag team championships
World professional wrestling championships